HYLAS 2 is a geostationary High throughput satellite operated by Avanti Communications. HYLAS, an acronym for Highly Adaptable Satellite, was launched on an Ariane 5 from Guyana Space Centre at Kourou, French Guiana, on August 2, 2012.

Construction
HYLAS 2 was constructed by Orbital Sciences Corporation on the STAR-2 platform for the UK telecommunications company Avanti Communications Plc.

Features
HYLAS 2 features 4 active and 6 gateway Ka beams covering Northern and Southern Africa, Eastern Europe and the Middle East. HYLAS 2 is also equipped with steerable spot-beams to direct extra capacity in required areas when needed.

See also

HYLAS 1
HYLAS 3

References

Satellites of the United Kingdom
Spacecraft launched in 2012
High throughput satellites
Communications satellites in geostationary orbit
Ariane commercial payloads
Satellites using the GEOStar bus